The First Half of My Life is a 2017 Chinese television series based on Hong Kong novelist Yi Shu's novel of the same name,  and centers on a group of city dwellers who have to make choices about love and career. It was directed by Shen Yan and stars Jin Dong, Ma Yili, Yuan Quan, Lei Jiayin, Wu Yue, and Chen Daoming. The series was first broadcast on Beijing Television and Dragon Television on 4 July 2017.

Synopsis
Luo Zijun lives a peaceful life as a full-time housewife, yet is unaware of the cracks in her marriage. One day, her husband Chen Junsheng files for divorce and she is shocked. After divorce, Luo Zijun heads back into the workforce with the help of her dear friend Tang Jing and He Han, both being white-collar workers and elites.

Cast

Main
 Jin Dong as He Han, an elite in the consulting industry. His girlfriend is Tang Jing, and they've been together for ten years.
 Ma Yili as Luo Zijun, a full-time housewife who lives a simple life after marriage with Chen Junsheng.
 Yuan Quan as Tang Jing, a career-minded woman and He Han's girlfriend.
 Lei Jiayin as Chen Junsheng, an elite in the career workforce and Luo Zijun's husband.
 Wu Yue as Ling Ling, Chen Junsheng's second wife.
 Chen Daoming as Zhuo Jianqing, He Han's friend.

Supporting
 Xu Di as Xue Zhenzhu, Luo Zijun and Luo Ziqun's mother.
 Zhang Lingxin as Luo Ziqun, Luo Zijun's younger sister.
 Zheng Luoqian as Wei Wei'an
 Wang Tianze as Leng Jiaqing, Ling Ling's son and Chen Junsheng's stepson.
 Vivian Wu as Aunt Wu
 Luan Yuanhui as Bai Guang
 Chuo Ni as Luoluo
 Mei Ting as Zhuo Jianqing's former girlfriend
 Tan Kai as Adom
 Kong Wei as a single woman
 Zhang Yanyan as Su Manshu
 Hou Yansong as Laojin
 Wei Zhihao as Ping'er
 Song Yunhao as Duan Xiaotian
 Xu Caigen as Cui Baojian
 Ren Jimin as Chen Junsheng's father
 Zhang Lan as Chen Junsheng's mother
 Ru Tian as Ya Qin
 Min Tianhao as A Hui
 Shi An as Lawyer Li
 Guo Tongtong as Xiaodong
 Chen Guanning as Cui Baojian's son
 Yang Mei as a chubby girl.
 Sun Yuhan as Caicai
 Xu Sheng as Phil
 Guan Xueying as Sandra Dong
 Bi Hanwen as the lawyer of Chen Junsheng
 Qu Lingzi as He Han's assistant
 Lu Ling as Yingying
 Cheng Hong as the marketing manager
 Huang Jing as Tang Jing's assistant
 Yu Mingjia as the CEO of Angel
 Ren Donglin as Li Rui
 Zhang Yi as Luo Ping

Soundtrack

Ratings 

 Highest ratings are marked in red, lowest ratings are marked in blue

Reception
Since its broadcast, the series has caused heated discussions online and obtained high ratings. Shen Yan, director of the series, attribute the show's success to its capability to capture modern life in China through several ordinary people's lives and the great influence of book writer Isabel Nee Yeh-su. By emphasizing the importance of female independence, the series has won much favor among female audiences. However, the series has been criticized by book fans for veering too much from the plot. Its display of improper ethical values has also been criticized for degrading social conduct.

Awards and nominations

International broadcast
The series will be broadcast by Star Chinese Channel outside of China and Mediacorp Channel 8 in Singapore every Saturday, 10:30pm to 12:30am the next day, broadcasting two episodes in a day.

It first aired in Thailand on Channel 3 in 2021 daily at 2:50 am starting Friday 27 August, following Eternal Love (rerun) finished.

References

External links
 
 
 

Television shows based on Chinese novels
2017 Chinese television series debuts
Chinese romance television series
Dragon Television original programming
Television series by New Classics Media